One of a Kind is a Canadian television panel game show which aired on CBC Television from 1958 to 1959.

Premise
The series featured a panel (Rita Greer Allen, Lloyd Bochner, Allan Manings and Kathie McNeil) who attempted to identity of an item using guesswork. Once the item was identified or revealed, the panel and moderator (Alex Barris) would discuss the item with an associated guest. The panel game was similar to Front Page Challenge except that this involved objects instead of news stories. Visiting personalities included Xavier Cugat, Celia Franca, Arthur Godfrey, Cedric Hardwicke, Celeste Holm, Mitch Miller, Jan Peerce, Kate Reid and Walter Susskind.

Scheduling
This half-hour series was broadcast Fridays at 8:30 p.m. (Eastern) from 6 June to 12 September 1958, then given a full season on Wednesdays at 8:30 p.m. from 1 October 1958 to 24 June 1959.

References

Further reading

External links
 
 

1950s Canadian game shows
1958 Canadian television series debuts
1959 Canadian television series endings
Black-and-white Canadian television shows
CBC Television original programming